Eivør Pálsdóttir (pronounced ; born 21 July 1983), known mononymously as Eivør, is a Faroese singer-songwriter and actress. Born and raised in Syðrugøta, she had her first televised performance  at the age of 13. Over the course of her decades-long career, her musical output has spanned a wide range of genres such as folk, art pop, jazz, folk rock, classical and electronica.

Career
In 1999, at the age of 15, she became the lead singer in Clickhaze. The following year, she released her first self-titled album, Eivør Pálsdóttir.

In 2001, Clickhaze won the Prix Føroyar song contest. She moved to Reykjavík in 2002 to study music, releasing an album with the music ensemble Yggdrasil the same year.

After her second solo album, Krákan, was released in 2003, she was nominated in three categories at the Icelandic Music Awards, winning Best Singer and Best Performer – normally only won by Icelandic artists.

In 2003, she participated in Söngvakeppni Sjónvarpsins with the song "Í Nótt".

In 2004, Eivør was named Arsins Føroyingur (Faroe Islander of the Year).

In 2005, the DR Big Band released its 40th anniversary album, with all songs written and sung by Eivør. The same year, she was awarded the Icelandic Gríma award for composing and performing the piece Úlfhamssaga, based on the Norse sagas.

In 2007, Eivør's 5th album Mannabarn was released. Produced by Dónal Lunny, an English-language version was released simultaneously under the name Human Child. The album was recorded throughout 2006 and early 2007 in Dublin, and reached #39 on the Danish Tracklisten.

In 2008, Eivør collaborated with English composer Gavin Bryars on Tróndur i Gøtu – based on the chieftain of the same name – duetting with bass singer Rúni Brattaberg. It was performed in Gøtugjógv on 12 July 2008.

In 2010, she released the album Larva, marking a stark departure away from her folk sound, moving towards a more experimental and electronic musical style.

In 2012 she married the Faroese composer Tróndur Bogason; the same year, they collaborated on the album Room, which won three awards at the Faroese Music Awards: Best Female Singer, Best Artist and Best Album of the Year. The following year, she covered "Den vilda" by One More Time in Icelandic, which charted on Tónlist TV.

In 2015, Eivør released two companion albums, Bridges and Slør, sung in English and Faroese respectively. Describing the writing process in an interview with Stacja Islandia, she said that "[it] kept coming to me in such a manner that I would write a lyric in English and straight afterwards a lyric in Faroese would arrive – a kind of mirror image or reflection. Most of the songs were written together in pairs. The albums are therefore two different works yet also a unity. This has been my dream project for over 2 years now."

In 2016, she collaborated with Bear McCreary on the soundtrack for God of War, performing it with a live orchestra at the E3 2016 Sony press conference. She collaborated with the DR Big Band once again that same year, releasing the orchestral album At the Heart of a Selkie.

In 2018, she collaborated with John Lunn on the soundtrack to The Last Kingdom.

In 2020, she released the album Segl. She became the cover artist first time of ÖMC Dergi (Dergi), Turkey's biggest digital music magazine, to promote her new album Segl. 

Describing the about album process in an interview with Alp Kılıç, she said that "I think that every album I make is marked by where I am in my life creatively and also personally, and every album has elements from my previous work entwined with new elements which I amcurious to explore. Slør is very much about home sickness and returning back to my roots. Segl is more about lookingout and navigating though unknown places."

ÖMC Dergi (Dergi) announced for the first time the Segl album and Segl Tour news in Turkey. 

She received the 2021 Nordic Council Music Prize.

Discography

Albums
 Eivør Pálsdóttir (SHD 50, Tutl Records, 2000)
 Clickhaze EP (HJF 91, Tutl Records, 2002)
 Yggdrasil (HJF 88, Tutl Records, 2002)
 Krákan (12T001, 12 tónar 2003)
 Eivør (12T010, 12 tónar 2004)
 Trøllabundin (together with the Big band of Danmarks Radio 2005)
 Human Child (R 60117-2, RecArt Music 2007)
 Mannabarn (R 60116-2, RecArt Music 2007, Faroese version of Human Child)
 
 Eivör Live
 Undo your mind EP (Copenhagen Records 2010)
 Larva (SHD 130, Tutl Records, 2010)
 Room (SHD145, Tutl Records, 2012)
 The Color of Dark (with Ginman) (2014)
 Bridges (SHD155, Tutl Records, 2015)
 Slør (SHD165, Tutl Records, 2015)
 At The Heart of a Selkie (with Peter Jensen & The Danish Radio Big Band, and The Danish National Vocal Ensemble (SHD175, Tutl Records, 2016)
 Slør (AGs1701, Tutl Records, licensed to A&G Records Ltd., English edition of Slør, 2017)
 London Solo Sessions (Live) EP, (Tutl Records, A&G Records Ltd., 2017)
 The Last Kingdom Original Television Soundtrack (with John Lunn) (Carnival, 2018)
 Live in Tórshavn (Norse Music, 2018)
 Segl (2020)

Singles
 "Undo Your Mind" (2010)
 "Dansaðu vindur" (2013)
 "Faithful Friend" (2015)
 "Remember Me" (2015)
 "In My Shoes" (2017)

Guest appearances and collaborations
Nephew feat. Eivør – "Police Bells and Church Sirens" (2010)
Beginner's Guide to Scandinavia (Nascente/Demon Music Group, 2011)
Nik & Jay feat. Eivør – "Bølgerne ved Vesterhavet" (2012)
Vamp – "Liten Fuggel" (2012)
The Last Kingdom television soundtrack (2015) – vocals; in score by John Lunn
The Banner Saga 3 video game soundtrack (2018) – vocals, score by Austin Wintory
God of War video game soundtrack (2018) – vocals, throat and drums; score by Bear McCreary
Worakls feat. Eivør – "Red Dressed" (2019)
Lydmor feat. Eivør – "Nevada" (2021)
God of War Ragnarök video game soundtrack (2022) – vocals; score by Bear McCreary

Filmography 

 Eivør: True Love (2013) – Main actress
111 Góðir Dagar (2021) – Supporting actress

Honours 
2004 Faroe Islander of the Year
2006 Planet Awards – Best female singer (Faroese music awards)
2009 Planet Awards – Best female singer
2006 Best Danish female folk from Jylland (Årets danske Folk Vokalist)
2012 Planet Awards – Best female singer / Best artist / Best album for Room
2013 Nominated for the Nordic Council Music Prize
2013 DJBFA (Danish Jazz, Beat and Folkmusic Authors) Award
2021 The Nordic Council Music Prize

References

External links

 
 Tutl.com (Faroese label)
 Í Gøtu ein dag  (Faroese text of the old ballad, performed on Eivør's first album – a tribute to her home place)
 Faroe Mission in London – Dimmalætting Awards Eivør... (Newsletter by the Faroese radio from 14 February 2005)
 Eivør on BBC Radio 3, October 23rd, 2006
  Eivør sings "Trøllabundin" before the statue "Kópakonan - The Seal Woman" on the island of Kalsoy

1983 births
Living people
Faroese women singers
Faroese guitarists
Faroese singer-songwriters
Faroese composers
English-language singers from the Faroe Islands
Folk-pop singers
21st-century Danish women singers
21st-century guitarists
21st-century women guitarists